The Stepdaughters is a Philippine television drama series starring Megan Young and Katrina Halili. The series premiered on GMA Network's GMA Afternoon Prime block and worldwide via GMA Pinoy TV from February 12 to October 19, 2018, replacing Impostora.

NUTAM (Nationwide Urban Television Audience Measurement) People in Television Homes ratings are provided by AGB Nielsen Philippines. The series ended, but its the 35th-week run, and with a total of 178 episodes. It was replaced by Asawa Ko, Karibal Ko.

Series overview

Episodes

February 2018

March 2018

April 2018

May 2018

June 2018

July 2018

August 2018

September 2018

October 2018

References

Lists of Philippine drama television series episodes